Vishnunarayanan Namboothiri (2 June 1939 – 25 February 2021) was an Indian writer and scholar of Malayalam literature. Known primarily for his poems, Namboothiri also contributed to other genres such as essays, translations and children's literature. Swathanthrathe Kurichu Oru Geetham, Bhoomigeethangal, Indiayenna Vikaaram and Charulata count among his notable works. The Government of India honored him with the fourth highest civilian award of the Padma Shri in 2014 and the Government of Kerala awarded him the Ezhuthachan Puraskaram, the highest literary award in Malayalam, the same year. He was also a recipient of Vayalar Award, Vallathol Award, Kerala Sahitya Akademi Award for Overall Contributions, Asan Prize, Sahitya Akademi Award and Odakkuzhal Award.

Biography 
Vishnunarayanan Namboothiri was born on June 2, 1939, to Vishnu Namboothiri and Adhithi Antharjanam at Seeravally Illam in Thiruvalla, Kerala. After traditional education of Vedas, Puranas and Sanskrit from his grandfather, he did his school education at Prince Marthanda Varma High School, Peringara and subsequently, obtained his graduate degree from St. Berchmans College, Changanacherry and his master's degree from St. Joseph's College, Devagiri, topping the examination. He started his career as a teacher of Mathematics at his alma mater, Peringara School but moved to Malabar Christian College as a faculty in English department. Later, he worked in various parts of the state such as Kozhikode, Kollam, Pattambi, Ernakulam, Tripunithura, Chittur, Thalassery (Government Brennen College) and the State Institute of Languages, before superannuating from service as the head of the department of English at the University College Thiruvananthapuram. Later, he also worked as the high priest at Sreevallabha Temple, his ancestral temple.

Vishnunarayanan Namboothiri was married to Savithri Antharjanam and the couple had two daughters, Adhithi and Aparna.

Death 
He died on February 25, 2021, aged 81, at his home in Thycaud near Thiruvananthapuram due to age-related illnesses. He was cremated with full state honours at Santhikavadam Crematorium near his home.

Temple controversy 
During his tenure as the high priest of Sreevallabha Temple, an official of the temple raised an issue in 1997 regarding his travel to London for presenting a paper on Vedas, which the official claimed that crossing the seas was an unacceptable practice for a priest. He was asked to abstain from performing his duties as the priest. However, the controversy subsided after public resistance and Namboothiri resumed his priestly duties.

Awards
Vishnunarayanan Namboothiri, whose poems are known to be a blend of tradition with modernity, received the Kerala Sahitya Akademi Award for Poetry in 1979 for his poetry anthology, Bhumigeethangal. Fifteen years later, Sahitya Akademi selected his anthology, Ujjayiniyile Rappakalukal for the 1994 Sahitya Akademi Award. In between, he received the Odakkuzhal Award for his work, Mukhamevide?. He received the Asan Smaraka Kavitha Puraskaram in 1996, and Kerala Sahitya Akademi honored him again in 2004 with their Award for Overall Contributions. He received the Mathrubhumi Literary Award in 2009 and the year 2010 brought him two awards, *Vayalar Award for Chaarulata and the Vallathol Award. The Government of India honored him in 2014 with Padma Shri, the fourth highest civilian award in India, and the same year, The Government of Kerala awarded him their highest literary award of the Ezhuthachan Puraskaram. The other awards received by him include Changampuzha Award, Ulloor Award, Pandalam Keralavarma Poetry Award, Deviprasadam Trust Award (2005), Ettumanoor Somadasan Sahitya Puraskaram and C. V. Kunhiraman Literary Prize.

Bibliography

Poetry

Essays

Travelogues

Translations
 
Rithu Samhaaram
Gandhi
 
Kuttikalude Shakespeare

See also 
 Malayalam literature

Further reading

References

External links
 
 
 

Malayalam-language writers
Recipients of the Sahitya Akademi Award in Malayalam
Recipients of the Kerala Sahitya Akademi Award
Academic staff of the University College Thiruvananthapuram
1939 births
2021 deaths
Malayalam poets
Writers from Kerala
Recipients of the Padma Shri in literature & education
People from Thiruvalla
Indian male essayists
20th-century Indian translators
20th-century Indian poets
20th-century Indian essayists
Indian male poets
20th-century Indian male writers